The University of KwaZulu-Natal Botanical Garden located in Pietermaritzburg, KwaZulu-Natal was established in 1983. Although the Garden was established to support research and conservation of indigenous plants, the Garden is open to the public.

See also
 List of botanical gardens in South Africa

References

External links
 University of KwaZulu-Natal Botanical Garden website

Botanical gardens in South Africa